Heinrich von Staden may refer to:

 Heinrich von Staden (author) (1542–?), self-proclaimed "adventurer in Muscovy" 
 Heinrich von Staden (historian) (born 1939), South African historian and classical scholar